Chalbi may refer to:
 Chalbi Desert, in Kenya
 Chalbi, Iran (disambiguation), places in Iran